Sargocentron dorsomaculatum, also known as the spotfin squirrelfish, is a species of squirrelfish found in the western Pacific Ocean near the Ryukyu Islands, Pohnpei, Kosrae, the Caroline Islands, and Palau. Like other members of its genus, it is nocturnal and seeks shelter among corals and other structures. It can reach sizes of up to  SL.

References

External links
 
 

dorsomaculatum
Fish described in 1979
Fish of the Pacific Ocean